BS33 may refer to:
 BS 33 Carbon Filament Electric Lamps, a British Standard
 BS-33 Marta Mata, a Spanish Maritime Safety and Rescue Society tugboat	
 BS 33, a Royal Lao Army Airborne Border Police Special Battalion